The TR Araña (Spanish, meaning "route tracing spider") is a robot which is claimed to remotely analyse the composition of the ground. The device was created by Chilean inventor Manuel Salinas and was reported to be able to operate at depths of up to 50 metres. It is widely believed by the scientific community to be a fraud.

Principles
Answering a request by the Chilean Commission on Nuclear Energy, Salinas wrote the following paragraph:

At a presentation at the Universidad Técnica Federico Santa María in Valparaíso, Chile, on 12 October 2005, Salinas gave fantastic and seemingly irrational theories to explain how his machine worked. Before an audience of students, physicists and engineers he offered inconsistent explanations. But after some questions by students (questions answered with a mix of science fiction and ignorance), professor and Doctorate in Physics Patricio Häberle spoke to the audience, thanking them for their patience and respect, but saying that the presentation would stop there, the University would neither support nor give space for it, and that what the person (referring to Salinas) had talked about was not serious.

Criticism
Salinas says that the robot bounces a nuclear signal off materials to search for specific atomic compositions. Consensus exists among scientists that the technology Salinas says is used on the robot works — but only to depths of 30 cm and anything beyond that, such as the dozens of meters he claims to be able to probe, would be considered a technological advance.

Salinas has refused to patent the machine, saying the technology is "an industrial secret."

References

External links 

"TR Araña: La octava maravilla" (El Mercurio) (in Spanish)

Detailed Image
Padre de TR Araña

Rolling robots
Robots of Chile
2005 robots
Pseudoscience
Hoaxes in science
Academic scandals